The World Matchplay, also known as the Betfred World Matchplay for sponsorship purposes, is a professional darts tournament and one of three legs of the Triple Crown. It is played in a legs format, and is run by the Professional Darts Corporation (PDC). Michael van Gerwen is the current champion after winning the 2022 edition.

History
The World Matchplay has been played annually since 1994 in the Empress Ballroom at the Winter Gardens, Blackpool. The first ever winner was Larry Butler, who beat Dennis Priestley 16–12, and the current holder is Micheal van Gerwen. It is regarded as the second biggest PDC Tournament, status shown by the fact the whole tournament was sold out within three days of the tickets being on sale.

The 1995 World Matchplay turned out to be Jocky Wilson's last appearance in a major televised event. Wilson had reached the quarter-finals of the inaugural tournament in 1994 and he beat Rod Harrington in the 1st round in 1995, but a 2nd round defeat against Nigel Justice was effectively the end of his career.

From 1994 to 2012, matches at the World Matchplay had to be won by two clear legs. For example, the first round was usually played over the first to 10 legs, but if the score reached 9–9, play continued until either player gained a two-leg lead. Starting with the 2013 World Matchplay, if a two leg-lead hadn't been established after six extra legs, then a sudden death leg is played, so sudden death would come into play in a first round match at 12–12.

Over the course of the tournament's 29-year existence, there have been eleven different winners: Phil Taylor (16), Michael van Gerwen (3), Rod Harrington (2), Gary Anderson (1), Larry Butler (1), Rob Cross (1), Peter Evison (1), Colin Lloyd (1) James Wade (1), Peter Wright (1) and Dimitri Van den Bergh (1). Dennis Priestley was also runner-up for three consecutive years.

From 2018 onwards, the World Matchplay champion will receive the Phil Taylor Trophy, as was announced by the PDC following the retirement of the sixteen-time winner of the tournament.

Due to the COVID-19 pandemic in the United Kingdom, the 2020 World Matchplay was held at the Marshall Arena, Milton Keynes, behind closed doors.

World Matchplay finals

Records and statistics

Total finalist appearances

 Active players are shown in bold
 Only players who reached the final are included
 In the event of identical records, players are sorted in alphabetical order by family name

Champions by country

Nine-dart finishes
Eight nine-dart finishes have been thrown at the World Matchplay. The first one was in 2002, when Phil Taylor hit the first live 9-darter in UK television history.

Tournament records

Longest match in Matchplay history  The 2018 final went to 40 legs as a result of the format of "2 clear legs".
Longest unbeaten run  Phil Taylor from 2008 to 2015: Won 38 matches in a row. Taylor only lost eight matches in the history of the event:
 1994 Bob Anderson 9–11 (tiebreak, second round)
 1996 Peter Evison 1–8 (second round)
 1998 Ronnie Baxter 10–13 (quarter-finals)
 1999 Peter Manley 14–17 (semi-finals)
 2005 John Part 11–16 (quarter-finals)
 2007 Terry Jenkins 11–17 (semi-finals)
 2015 James Wade 14–17 (semi-finals)
 2016 Michael van Gerwen 10–18 (Final)

Averages
An average over 100 in a match in the PDC World Matchplay has been achieved 142 times, of which Phil Taylor is responsible for 62. In 2010, Phil Taylor became the first player to average over 100 in all five rounds of the tournament. He repeated this feat in 2011 and 2013.

An average of over 105 in a match in the World Matchplay has been achieved 35 times, of which Phil Taylor is responsible for 24. The highest match average ever in the World Matchplay is 114.99 by Phil Taylor in his Last 32 victory over Barrie Bates in 2010. The highest match average ever in the World Matchplay Final is 111.23 by Phil Taylor against Adrian Lewis in 2013.

Format
From the beginning of the tournament in 1994, the World Matchplay has always been a legs only event. The length of matches for each round has changed several times over the years, as shown below.

1994
First Round: First to 8 legs (match must be won by 2 clear legs)
Second Round: First to 8 legs (match must be won by 2 clear legs)
Quarter Finals: First to 11 legs (match must be won by 2 clear legs)
Semi Finals: First to 11 legs (match must be won by 2 clear legs)
Final: First to 16 legs (match must be won by 2 clear legs)

1995–1996
First Round: First to 8 legs (match must be won by 2 clear legs)
Second Round: First to 8 legs (match must be won by 2 clear legs)
Quarter Finals: First to 11 legs (match must be won by 2 clear legs)
Semi Finals: First to 13 legs (match must be won by 2 clear legs)
Final: First to 16 legs (match must be won by 2 clear legs)

1997
Preliminary Round: First to 6 legs (no tiebreak; sudden death leg at 5–5)
First Round: First to 8 legs (match must be won by 2 clear legs)
Second Round: First to 8 legs (match must be won by 2 clear legs)
Quarter Finals: First to 11 legs (match must be won by 2 clear legs)
Semi Finals: First to 13 legs (match must be won by 2 clear legs)
Final: First to 16 legs (match must be won by 2 clear legs)

1998
First Round: First to 8 legs (match must be won by 2 clear legs)
Second Round: First to 8 legs (match must be won by 2 clear legs)
Quarter Finals: First to 13 legs (match must be won by 2 clear legs)
Semi Finals: First to 13 legs (match must be won by 2 clear legs)
Final: First to 18 legs (match must be won by 2 clear legs)

1999–2012
First Round: First to 10 legs (match must be won by 2 clear legs)
Second Round: First to 13 legs (match must be won by 2 clear legs)
Quarter Finals: First to 16 legs (match must be won by 2 clear legs)
Semi Finals: First to 17 legs (match must be won by 2 clear legs)
Final: First to 18 legs (match must be won by 2 clear legs)

2013–2015
First Round: First to 10 legs (match must be won by 2 clear legs; sudden death leg at 12–12)
Second Round: First to 13 legs (match must be won by 2 clear legs; sudden death leg at 15–15)
Quarter Finals: First to 16 legs (match must be won by 2 clear legs; sudden death leg at 18–18)
Semi Finals: First to 17 legs (match must be won by 2 clear legs; sudden death leg at 19–19)
Final: First to 18 legs (match must be won by 2 clear legs; sudden death leg at 20–20)

2016–present
First Round: First to 10 legs (match must be won by 2 clear legs; sudden death leg at 12–12)
Second Round: First to 11 legs (match must be won by 2 clear legs; sudden death leg at 13–13)
Quarter Finals: First to 16 legs (match must be won by 2 clear legs; sudden death leg at 18–18)
Semi Finals: First to 17 legs (match must be won by 2 clear legs; sudden death leg at 19–19)
Final: First to 18 legs (match must be won by 2 clear legs; sudden death leg at 20–20)

Media coverage
The World Matchplay has been broadcast in the UK by Sky Sports since the first tournament.

Sponsors
There have been seven different sponsors for the World Matchplay:

References

External links
 World Matchplay page on the PDC website
 World Matchplay on Darts Database

 
Professional Darts Corporation tournaments
Darts in England
Sport in Blackpool
Sport in Milton Keynes
Recurring sporting events established in 1994
1994 establishments in England
Annual sporting events in the United Kingdom